São Francisco de Assis is a Brazilian municipality in the western part of the state of Rio Grande do Sul.  It has a population of 18,205 (2020).  Its elevation is 151 m.  It has an area of 2,530.9 km².  It is located 434 km west of the state capital of Porto Alegre.  The nickname of the city is Sao Chico.

The city is situated by the Jaguari, near the city of Santa Maria. They plant soy and produce milk. The city had been showing significant growth, compared to the last decade.

References

External links
http://www.citybrazil.com.br/rs/saofranciscoassis/ 

Municipalities in Rio Grande do Sul